Modrá Hvězda Dobřany is a small, independent brewery in Dobřany near Plzeň in the Czech Republic.

Beer has been brewed in Dobřany since 1378. The brewery reopened in 1998 under the guiding hand of Jaroslav Franěk who worked in the Pilsner Urquell brewery until he decided to try his own hand.

Jaroslav Franěk was not the first in Dobřany who tried to open a brewery. Beer has been brewed here since the First Republic. When the Second World War began, the brewery was closed. An attempt to reopen it after 1945 failed. And so again, Dobřany beer brewing began in 1994 when Franěk bought a house in the square and built a restaurant with a small brewery. Equipment was supplied by Pacovske engineering works. The capacity of the brewery was 1,000 hectolitres per year.

References

External links 
 

Breweries in the Czech Republic
Plzeň-South District